Newton Reigny is a village and former civil parish, now in the parish of Catterlen, in the Eden District, in the English county of Cumbria, near the town of Penrith. In 1931 the parish had a population of 168.

History
"'New tūn'...This was held in 1185...by William de Reigni."
Therefore, 'new village' (from the Old English), 'held by Reigny'.

On 1 April 1934 the parish was abolished and merged with Catterlen.

See also

Listed buildings in Catterlen

References

External links

  Cumbria County History Trust: Newton Reigny (nb: provisional research only - see Talk page)

Villages in Cumbria
Former civil parishes in Cumbria
Eden District